Ann Leonard (born 2 January 1969) is a former Fianna Fáil politician from County Monaghan in Ireland. She was a senator from 1997 to 2002, and is the daughter of Jimmy Leonard, a former Teachta Dála (TD) for  Cavan–Monaghan.

A paediatric nurse and midwife, Leonard unsuccessfully contested the 1997 general election in the Cavan–Monaghan constituency, and after her defeat she was nominated by the Taoiseach Bertie Ahern, to the 21st Seanad. At the 1999 local elections, she was elected to Monaghan County Council for the Clones electoral area, but stood down from the council at the 2004 local elections and did not stand in any further elections.

See also
Families in the Oireachtas

References

1969 births
Living people
Fianna Fáil senators
Members of the 21st Seanad
20th-century women members of Seanad Éireann
21st-century women members of Seanad Éireann
Local councillors in County Monaghan
Irish nurses
Irish midwives
Nominated members of Seanad Éireann